Yantai University is a key provincial public university of Shandong Province founded in 1984 with the assistance of two C9 league members (Peking University and Tsinghua University) in Yantai, Shandong, China.Yantai University is located in Yantai, a national historical and cultural city and one of the best charming cities in China. It is a key comprehensive university in Shandong Province.

History
Yantai University was established as a modern comprehensive university along the coast in Yantai, in July 1984, from a generous bequest by Zhang Chengxian. Zhang Chengxian was appointed the first president.

Overview
Yantai University's motto is 'to be honest, modest and natural'. Its coat of arms is constituted by a dolphin and ocean flows, designating intellectual and mind opening respectively. The majority of students registering in Yantai University are Shandong natives.

In 2008, the university had 21 faculties and provides 49 programs covering arts, law, science, education, management, medicine, music, engineering, continuing education, international culture.

The university library serves the community with 1,680,000 physical bibliographies and 700,000 electronic items.

International education
Yantai University has stable communication with academic institutes in the United Kingdom, Canada, Norway, Australia, Korea, Germany, and the United States. Each year, about 500 international students accept their admissions from Yantai University. A number of teachers from the United States, United Kingdom, and Canada are working for the university. It is also home to international students who are studying Chinese language.

Geography
The university is along coast and a 25-minute ride from downtown by bus No. 7 or No. 10, both of which terminate outside the railway station and quite close to one of the several long-distance bus stations in the city. The Coal College now named Shandong Institute is no more than a 15-minute walk from the university's north gate.

Gallery

References

External links

 Official Website of Yantai University (in English)

Universities and colleges in Shandong